The 1978–79 Miami Redskins men's ice hockey team represented the Miami University in college ice hockey. In its inaugural varsity season the team was coached by Steve Cady and played at the newly opened Miami Ice Arena.

Season
Miami's ice hockey program was promoted to varsity status in the summer of 1978. In their first season the Redskins remained in the Mid–Central Collegiate Hockey Association, a small collection of local club teams, mainly so it could field a full schedule. Miami was also able to schedule 10 games against Division I opponents that would take place throughout the season.

After an initial win over Cincinnati, Miami was beaten soundly in four consecutive games. The losses were against the top-tier squads which was a trend that would continue throughout the season. Miami finished the regular season with a very good 12–3–1 record in conference, but lost all 10 games against the D-I teams. Miami's up and down year came to an end with the MCCHA tournament, with the entire championship being played in its home arena. The Redskins took advantage of the opportunity and routed Eastern Michigan before shutting out Michigan–Dearborn to claim the championship.

As Miami continued to transition into a full Division I schedule, the team knew it had a long way to go before it could compete with the rest of the big programs.

Roster

Standings

Schedule

|-
!colspan=12 style=";" | Regular Season

|-
!colspan=12 style=";" |

Roster and scoring statistics

Players drafted into the NHL

1979 NHL Entry Draft
Miami did not have any players selected in the NHL Entry Draft.

References

Miami RedHawks men's ice hockey seasons
Miami
Miami
Miami Redskins ice hockey
Miami Redskins ice hockey